The Edinburgh Herald & Post was a weekly Scottish freesheet that delivered to households in Edinburgh, Midlothian and Musselburgh. It consisted mainly of advertising and promotional pieces, with news items sourced from sister publication Edinburgh Evening News. It had a circulation of 138,000 and was owned by The Scotsman Publications, which also owned The Scotsman and Edinburgh Evening News. It was delivered Thursday/Friday mostly by teenagers.

Newspapers published in Scotland
Culture in Edinburgh
Defunct newspapers published in the United Kingdom
Newspapers published by Johnston Press